An aircraft boneyard or aircraft graveyard is a storage area for aircraft that are retired from service. Most aircraft at boneyards are either kept for storage with some maintenance or have their parts removed for reuse or resale and are then scrapped. Boneyard facilities are generally located in deserts, such as those in the Southwestern United States, since the dry conditions reduce corrosion and the hard ground does not need to be paved. In some cases, aircraft that were planned to be scrapped or were stored indefinitely without plans of ever returning to service were brought back into service, as the aviation market or the demands of military aviation changed or failed to develop as anticipated.

Military aircraft 
The 309th Aerospace Maintenance and Regeneration Group in Tucson, Arizona, the largest facility of its kind, is colloquially known as "The Boneyard".

Commercial aircraft 
Due to the impact of the Covid-19 pandemic on aviation, demand for commercial aircraft storage increased dramatically in 2020. Furthermore, many aircraft that had initially been planned for short term storage were ultimately stored long term or even scrapped altogether, requiring maintenance work to prepare the planes for the different plans. As demand recovery behaved differently from expectations, temporary shortages as well as the requirement to prepare planes for long term storage after a few months of short term storage caused issues. Planes that have been stored for a few months cannot be brought back to service on short notice. The longer planes are stored, the more time it takes to get them fully airworthy and ready to fly again. Bringing a narrowbody aircraft back from long term storage takes roughly 40 worker hours while for widebody aircraft the number is roughly 100 worker hours.

Notable aircraft boneyards

See also
 Aircraft recycling
 Ship graveyard
 Spacecraft cemetery
 Tarbes–Lourdes–Pyrénées Airport and Châteauroux-Centre "Marcel Dassault" Airport are also airports with an aircraft boneyard
 PAMELA Project
 Aircraft Fleet Recycling Association

References

External links
 
 Map of Aircraft Boneyards around the world.

 
Vehicle graveyards